Kuala Besut is a mukim in Besut District, Terengganu, Malaysia.

It is the departure point for boats to the Perhentian Islands. There are a variety of tour operators that tourist can choose for getting to Perhentian Islands. Small shops selling souvenirs of Perhentian Islands are also available around the town.

History

World War II 
Imperial Japanese forces from Kota Bharu successfully invades Kuala Besut on 10 December 1942 in order to capture the airfield on Gong Kedak before proceeding to the capital of Terengganu.

Climate
Kuala Besut has a tropical rainforest climate (Af) with moderate rainfall from February to May and heavy to very heavy to very heavy rainfall in the remaining months.

Gallery

References

External links 

JPN Website

Besut District
Mukims of Terengganu